Frankowski (feminine: Frankowska; plural: Frankowscy) is a Polish-language surname. It may refer to:
 Krzysztof Frankowski (born 1959), Polish footballer
 Leo Frankowski (1943-2008), American writer
 Przemysław Frankowski (born 1995), Polish footballer
 Rosie Frankowski (born 1991), American skier
 Stefan Frankowski (1887-1940), Polish Navy officer
 Tomasz Frankowski (born 1974), Polish footballer
 Wacław Frankowski (1903-1981), Polish labour activist

Polish-language surnames